Aberystwyth University Football Club (Welsh: Clwb Pêl-droed Prifysgol Aberystwyth) is a football club based in Aberystwyth, Wales. They currently playing in the Central Wales League Southern Division. The club represent the Students Union of Aberystwyth University – the Aberystwyth Guild of Students.

The club's crest are those of the university. The home colours are Red shirts with black shorts and red socks.

The club enjoys friendly rivalries with fellow town-dwellers Penparcau F.C., Bow Street F.C. of Rhydypennau, and Aberystwyth Town who play in the Welsh Premier League.

Players

Current squad

Committee Members

References 

Football clubs in Wales
Mid Wales Football League clubs
Aberystwyth University
Sport in Aberystwyth
University and college football clubs in Wales
Sport in Ceredigion